William Henry Walker (born October 9, 1987) is an American professional basketball player for Gladiadores de Anzoátegui of the Superliga Profesional de Baloncesto (SPB). Previously known as Bill Walker, the 6-foot-6-inch-tall (1.98 m) player was selected out of Kansas State University by the Washington Wizards with the 47th overall pick in the second round of the 2008 NBA draft and traded shortly thereafter to the Boston Celtics in exchange for cash considerations.

High school career
Walker was a three-year starter at North College Hill High School in North College Hill, Ohio, where he was a consensus Top 10 high school recruit and a teammate of future NBA lottery pick O. J. Mayo. His achievements include:
 2006 Second-team Parade All-American
 2006 USA Today All-USA High School Boys' Basketball All-Junior Team
 2006 EA Sports High School Boys' Basketball First Team
 Ohio High School Basketball Coaches Association All-State First Team
 Cincinnati Enquirer All-State First Team

As a sophomore and junior in 2005 and 2006, Walker helped North College Hill to back-to-back Ohio Division III state titles and was named the Most Valuable Player of the 2006 State Tournament. In 2006, North College Hill finished third in the USA Today Super 25 High School rankings, with Walker averaging 21.7 points and 10.1 rebounds per game. He was selected the USA Today National Player of the Week on March 27, 2006. In the fall of 2006, Walker graduated early after it was ruled that he had used all of his high school athletics eligibility the previous year.

Walker also helped the USA White team to a 5–0 record at the 2005 USA Youth Development Festival in San Diego, California, where he played alongside Ohio State freshman Greg Oden and Kansas freshman Darrell Arthur. He was the only three-time Most Valuable Player at the Reebok ABCD Camp in Teaneck, New Jersey.

College career
After receiving interest from many NCAA teams, including Cincinnati, Connecticut, Illinois, Syracuse, Southern California and Texas, Walker enrolled at Kansas State University as a part-time student in order to be eligible to play on December 16, 2006, the start of the second semester. He had an immediate impact on the team, averaging 11.3 points and 4.5 rebounds per game in his first six games. However, he ruptured the anterior cruciate ligament (ACL) in his left knee early in a game against Texas A&M on January 6, 2007, which required surgery and abruptly ended his freshman season. This was the second time he suffered this type of injury, going through surgery and rehab in his right knee in 2003.

In the 2007–08 season, Walker averaged 16.1 points and 6.3 rebounds in 31 games. He tied his career-high with 31 points in a 92–86 loss at Baylor on February 23, 2008, and combined with teammate Michael Beasley to score 75 of the Wildcats' 86 points in that game. On April 14, 2008, Walker announced along with Beasley that he would enter the 2008 NBA draft and thus forgo his last three years of eligibility.

Professional career

Boston Celtics (2008–2010)
Many considered Walker a lottery pick, but he suffered the third knee injury in his career during a workout at the Golden State Warriors facility on June 15, 2008. He remained in the draft despite the injury, and was selected on June 26, 2008 by the Washington Wizards with the 47th overall pick in the 2008 NBA draft, but was subsequently traded to the Boston Celtics for cash considerations after visiting the Celtics three days earlier. He was expected to have minor surgery in July that would keep him out for three to four weeks.

In November 2008, Walker was sent to the Celtics' NBA Development League affiliate, the Utah Flash, and was recalled on January 8, 2009. On November 21, 2009, the Celtics assigned Walker to the Maine Red Claws in the NBA Development League. On December 23, 2009, Walker was recalled from the Red Claws by the Celtics.

New York Knicks (2010–2012)
On February 18, 2010, Walker, along with J. R. Giddens, Eddie House and a future conditional second round draft pick, was traded to the Knicks for Nate Robinson and Marcus Landry.

Walker was released by the Knicks on April 20, 2012.

Austin Toros (2013)
On February 19, 2013, Walker was acquired by the Austin Toros. On March 25, he was waived by the Toros. On April 3, he was acquired by the Sioux Falls Skyforce. However, he never played a game for Sioux Falls.

Trotamundos de Carabobo (2013)
On May 20, 2013, Walker signed with Trotamundos de Carabobo of Venezuela.

Sioux Falls Skyforce (2013–2014)
On October 31, 2013, Walker was reacquired by the Sioux Falls Skyforce.

Alaska Aces (2014)
In April 2014, he signed with the Alaska Aces for the 2014 Governors’ Cup.

Second stint with Sioux Falls Skyforce (2014–2015)
On November 3, 2014, Walker was again reacquired by the Sioux Falls Skyforce.

Miami Heat (2015)
On February 21, 2015, he signed a 10-day contract with the Miami Heat. In his first game with the Heat, Walker recorded 11 points, and made 3 out of his 4 3-pointers in a 119-108 win over the Philadelphia 76ers. He then signed a second 10-day contract with the Heat on March 3, and for the rest of the season on March 13. On July 27, 2015, Walker was waived by the Heat.

Cedevita Zagreb (2015–2016)
On November 7, 2015, Walker signed with the Croatian club Cedevita Zagreb for the rest of the season.

NLEX Road Warriors (2016)
On June 8, 2016, Walker signed with the NLEX Road Warriors of the Philippine Basketball Association as the team's import for the 2016 PBA Governors' Cup.

Third stint with Sioux Falls Skyforce (2016–2017)
On November 16, Walker was reacquired by the Sioux Falls Skyforce.

Galatasaray (2018)
On January 2, 2018, Walker signed with Turkish club Galatasaray.

Defensor Sporting (2018)
On March 30, 2018, Walker was reported to have signed with Defensor Sporting.

Second stint with Blackwater Elite (2018)
On May 21, 2018, Walker signed again with the Blackwater Elite for the 2018 PBA Commissioner's Cup as a replacement for Jarrid Famous. He only just appeared in 5 games with the Elite in the 2018 PBA Commissioner's Cup. In those 5 games, he averaged 13 points per game, 10.2 rebounds per game and .6 blocks per game.

Shiga Lakestars (2019–2021)
On February 11, 2019, he signed with the Shiga Lakestars in the Japanese B.League.

Club La Cancha (2021)
On October 22, 2021, he signed with Club La Cancha.

Rain or Shine Elasto Painters (2021–2022)
In November 2021, Walker signed with Rain or Shine Elasto Painters of the Philippine Basketball Association.

NBA career statistics

Regular season

|-
| align="left" | 
| align="left" | Boston
| 29 || 0 || 7.4 || .621 || .000 || .696 || 1.0 || .4 || .2 || .1 || 3.0
|-
| align="left" | 
| align="left" | Boston
| 8 || 0 || 3.6 || .500 || .000 || 1.000 || .6 || .4 || .0 || .0 || 1.0
|-
| align="left" | 
| align="left" | New York
| 27 || 13 || 27.4 || .518 || .431 || .787 || 3.1 || 1.4 || .9 || .1 || 11.9
|-
| align="left" | 
| align="left" | New York
| 61 || 1 || 12.9 || .441 || .386 || .705 || 2.0 || .6 || .3 || .1 || 4.9
|-
| align="left" | 
| align="left" | New York
| 32 || 8 || 19.4 || .398 || .319 || .850 || 2.5 || 1.2 || .6 || .2 || 5.9
|-
| align="left" | 
| align="left" | Miami
| 24 || 13 || 26.2 || .345 || .341 || .778 || 3.4 || 1.2 || 1.0 || .4 || 7.3
|-
| align="left" | Career
| align="left" |
| 181 || 35 || 16.7 || .446 || .369 || .760 || 2.2 || .8 || .5 || .1 || 6.0

Playoffs

|-
| align="left" | 2009
| align="left" | Boston
| 4 || 0 || 2.5 || .000 || .000 || 1.000 || .0 || .0 || .5 || .0 || .5
|-
| align="left" | 2011
| align="left" | New York
| 4 || 0 || 22.3 || .300 || .273 || .667 || 3.3 || 1.0 || 1.3 || .0 || 5.8
|-
| align="left" | Career
| align="left" |
| 8 || 0 || 12.4 || .281 || .273 || .800 || 1.6 || .5 || .9 || .0 || 3.1

Personal life
Having been known as Bill for most of his life, in January 2014, Walker began going by his middle name, Henry.

See also
2006 high school boys basketball All-Americans

References

External links
 Bill Walker Player Info @ DraftExpress.com
 Bill Walker – Kansas State Player Bio
 Bill Walker Draft 2008 Profile @ NBA.com

1987 births
Living people
21st-century African-American sportspeople
African-American basketball players
Alaska Aces (PBA) players
American expatriate basketball people in Croatia
American expatriate basketball people in the Dominican Republic
American expatriate basketball people in Japan
American expatriate basketball people in the Philippines
American expatriate basketball people in Turkey
American expatriate basketball people in Uruguay
American expatriate basketball people in Venezuela
American men's basketball players
Basketball players from West Virginia
Blackwater Bossing players
Boston Celtics players
Galatasaray S.K. (men's basketball) players
Kansas State Wildcats men's basketball players
KK Cedevita players
Maine Red Claws players
McDonald's High School All-Americans
Miami Heat players
New York Knicks players
NLEX Road Warriors players
Parade High School All-Americans (boys' basketball)
Philippine Basketball Association imports
Rain or Shine Elasto Painters players
Shiga Lakes players
Shooting guards
Sioux Falls Skyforce players
Sportspeople from Huntington, West Virginia
Small forwards
Trotamundos B.B.C. players
Utah Flash players
Washington Wizards draft picks